Kirchensittenbach is a municipality in the district of Nürnberger Land in Bavaria in Germany. Hohenstein Castle stands within it.

References

Nürnberger Land